is a railway line in Wakayama Prefecture owned by Nankai Electric Railway. This line connects to the Nankai Main Line. Starting on November 2014, it is referred to by the nickname "Kada Sakana Line" (加太さかな線).

History
The Kada Light Railway Co. opened the line in 1912, electrifying it at 1500 VDC in 1930.

The company merged with Nankai in 1942, and freight services ceased in 1984.

Stations

References
This article incorporates material from the corresponding article in the Japanese Wikipedia

Kada Line
Rail transport in Wakayama Prefecture